Roman Borysovych Brener (1 January 1932 – 1991) was a Soviet and Ukrainian diver and pool player. He competed in the 3m springboard and 10m platform at the 1952 and 1956 Summer Olympics and finished in fifth-eight place in all competitions. He won both the springboard and platform at the 1954 European Aquatics Championships. 

Nationally, he won eight titles in the springboard (1950–1954 and 1958–1960) and two in the platform (1951, 1962).

References

1932 births
1991 deaths
Olympic divers of the Soviet Union
Divers at the 1952 Summer Olympics
Divers at the 1956 Summer Olympics
Soviet male divers
Soviet pool players